John Donoghue was a Scottish professional footballer who played as a left back.

Career 
Born in New York City to Irish parents who then moved to Scotland when he was young, Donoghue played for Shawfield Juniors, Celtic, Wrexham and Excelsior Roubaix.

He won two Glasgow Cups with Celtic and played on the losing side in the 1928 Scottish Cup Final; he took part in earlier rounds the previous season when they won the trophy, but was not involved in the final.

References 

1902 births
1971 deaths
Scottish footballers
Footballers from Glasgow
People from Gorbals
American soccer players
Soccer players from New York City
American emigrants to Scotland
American people of Irish descent
Scottish people of Irish descent
Celtic F.C. players
Wrexham A.F.C. players
Excelsior AC (France) players
Ligue 1 players
Expatriate footballers in France
American expatriate soccer players
Scottish expatriate footballers
Scottish expatriate sportspeople in France
American expatriate sportspeople in France
Shawfield F.C. players
Association football defenders
Scottish Junior Football Association players
Scottish Football League players